"Come On" is a song performed by British electronic duo Kish Mauve. It was written and produced by band members Mima Stilwell and Jim Eliot for their debut album Black Heart (2009).- The song was released as a double A-side single with "Morphine" on 2 March 2009 by YNYS Recordings. In 2011, "Come One" was covered by British singer-songwriter Will Young and released as the second single from his fifth studio album, Echoes (2011).

Track listings 
All tracks were written and composed by Mima Stilwell and Jim Eliot.

Release history

Will Young version

"Come On" was covered by British singer-songwriter and actor Will Young.  It was released on 21 November 2011 as the second single from his fifth studio album, Echoes (2011). The song peaked at 83 on the UK Singles Chart.

Critical reception
Robert Copsey of Digital Spy gave the song four stars out of five and a called it "far more than a note-for-note rehash. "Walk away, that's what you do," he bawls innocently over bobbing synths courtesy of Richard X, before defiantly calling "come on, come on" to his contrary lover. In fact, even after repeated listens, Young's lounge-pop reinvention still sounds like a different number altogether."

Music video
A music video to accompany the release of "Come On," directed by Chris Sweeney, was first released onto YouTube on 24 October 2011 at a total length of three minutes and twenty-eight seconds.

The video features a young man and his pet at a dog talent show. The pair struggle through most of the rounds, much to the disapproval of the judges and crowd. Later the dog injures its leg during the obstacle course, which the owner attends to and carefully bandages, while a flashback plays of their long relationship since childhood. During the final round of the day, the pair surprised the audience by performing acrobatics and a coordinated dance, causing the crowd to cheer.

Track listing
All tracks written by Mima Stilwell, and Jim Eliot.

Notes
 denotes additional producer
 denotes remix producer

Credits and personnel

 Jim Eliot – additional producer, writer
 Pete Hofmann – additional producer, mixing engineer
 Alex Meadows – bass
 Jeremy Shaw – guitar

 Mima Stilwell – writer
 Tim Weller – drums
 Richard X – producer
 Will Young – vocals, writer

Charts

Release history

References

External links
Official Myspace

2009 singles
Song recordings produced by Richard X
Songs written by Jim Eliot
Songs written by Mima Stilwell
2009 songs
Kish Mauve songs
Will Young songs